The palmate newt (Lissotriton helveticus) is a species of newt found in Western Europe, from Great Britain to the northern Iberian peninsula. The underside is yellow to orange, and the throat, unlike in the similar smooth newt, always unspotted. A dark stripe runs along the head and through the eyes. Breeding males develop a distinct filament on the end of their tail, strongly webbed hind feet, and a low, smooth crest on their back.

Habitats include forests, marshes, pastures or gardens. While on land, the newts are mainly nocturnal. After emerging from hibernation in spring, they move to stagnant, fish-free water bodies for breeding. After a courtship display, the male deposits a spermatophore that is picked up by the female. Larvae develop over after 1.5–3.5 months before metamorphosing into land-dwelling juveniles (efts). Sexual maturity is reached after two to three years, and the newts can reach a total age of up to 12 years in the wild. The species is overall common and has been assessed as Least Concern by the IUCN.

Taxonomy

The palmate newt was first described scientifically in 1789, by Russian naturalist Grigory Razumovsky. He placed it in the genus of the green lizards and named it Lacerta helvetica, with "helvetica" referring to the Swiss type locality in the canton of Vaud. He also gave Lacerta paradoxa as alternative name, which is today regarded as a junior synonym. Several names published over time, in different genera, are also now treated as synonyms for the palmate newt. Most recently, the species was included in the genus Triturus, along with most European newts. This genus however was found to be polyphyletic, containing several unrelated lineages, and the small-bodied newts, including the palmate newt, were therefore split off as separate genus in 2004 by García-París and colleagues. They used the genus name Lissotriton, introduced by the English zoologist Thomas Bell in 1839. Two distinct subspecies, L. h. alonsoi and L. h. punctillatus, were described from the Iberian peninsula, but have not been retained by Raffaëlli and Sparreboom.

Description

Palmate newts grow to about  total length in males, while females are somewhat larger and can reach . The tail is slightly shorter than the snout–vent distance. The head is longer than wide, with three longitudinal grooves on the snout. Both sexes have an olive or brown base colour, and males and some females have dark spotting on their backs. In females, the spots can sometimes form two irregular lines, and they can have a red stripe running along the back while living on land. In both sexes, a dark stripe runs along the head through the eyes. The underside is yellow or light orange and more whitish on the sides; the belly can have some dark spots, while the throat is always unspotted. While the newts live on land, the skin is dry and velvety, but it becomes smooth when they migrate into water.

Males can be distinguished from females by the larger and darker-coloured cloaca. During the aquatic breeding season, the cloaca swells, and other sexual differences develop: Males grow a low, smooth skin seam (a crest) on their back, which is higher on the tail. Their tail has a blunt end with a distinct, 4–7 mm long filament. They also have ridges (dorso-lateral ridges) running along their sides, giving them an angular, square shape in cross-section, and their hind feet have well-developed, dark webbing. The lower half of the tail is blue in breeding males and orange in females. Development of the crest, tail filament, ridges, and webbing can be suppressed in the presence of the newts' natural predators. When exposed to predatory goldfish, newts do not express these traits, as large sexual ornaments would make them more conspicuous prey. Females do not develop a crest, tail filament or webbed feet.

Sometimes confused with the smooth newt (Lissotriton vulgaris) which is found in much of the same area, the palmate newt can be distinguished by its unspotted throat. It also resembles Boscá's newt (L. boscai) from the Iberian peninsula, which has only a single groove on the snout and no dark eye strip.

Distribution and habitats

The palmate newt occurs in Western Europe, from Great Britain (up to Scotland) to northern Portugal and Spain. In the east, it ranges to the Elbe river in Germany and the Czech Republic and the lower and mid Alps in Switzerland. Genetic analyses by Recuero and García-París suggest that the species was confined to the Iberian peninsula during the Last Glacial Maximum and then expanded its range north of the Pyrenees.

Common over most of its range, the palmate newt is found in a variety of habitats, including forest, marshes and pasture. It is less abundant in cultivated areas, but can adapt to gardens. For reproduction, the newts accept different types of stagnant water bodies, preferably fish-free; acidic ponds are well tolerated. The smooth newt occurs over much of the same area, but in France appears to prefer ponds in open land, while the palmate newt prefers forest ponds; hybrids between the two species are rare.

Lifecycle and reproduction

The reproductive period usually extends from February to May, but can start earlier or last longer in the southern range on the Iberian Peninsula, depending on elevation. The newts can use magnetoreception over larger distances and the calls of frogs over shorter distances to find their breeding ponds. Once in the water, they are active during day and night. Breeding involves a ritualised courtship display as in other closely related newts: The male attempts to attract a female by swimming in front of her and sniffing her cloaca. He then vibrates his tail against his body, sometimes lashing it (but less violently than in the smooth newt), thereby fanning pheromones towards her. In the final phase, its a packet of sperm (a spermatophore). He then guides her over the spermatophore so she picks it up with her cloaca.

The females lays 150–440 eggs individually on water plants. These are 1.3–1.8 mm in diameter (2.2–3 mm with capsule) and very similar to those of the smooth newt. Larvae hatch after 8–21 days, depending on temperature, at a size of 8–14 mm. The young larvae are yellow–brown, with two black stripes, and have two appendages (balancers) on the sides of the head, which are later resorbed. As they grow, their characteristics are affected by their environment. Specifically, in response to chemical cues from predatory dragonfly larvae, larval newts develop larger heads and tails, and develop darker tail pigmentation. Additionally, dragonflies were more likely to prey on newts without such changes, which may be because a larger tail size facilitates newt predator escape behavior. They metamorphose into land-dwelling juveniles (efts) after 1.5–3.5 months, but some larvae instead overwinter in water. Paedomorphism, where adults keep their gills and stay aquatic, is also known.

The young efts live on land until maturity, which is reached in the second or third year. Activity on land occurs mainly during humid nights. The palmate newt usually hibernates on land but sometimes in the water, and in the Iberian peninsula, it is often active year-round. Larvae, efts and adults mainly feed on various invertebrates, but cannibalism also occurs, mainly by larvae preying on eggs. An age of up to 12 years can be reached in the wild.

Threats and conservation

Palmate newt populations are not in decline overall, and the species has been assessed as Least Concern by the IUCN. In France, it is the most common newt species, but it is rare in Belgium and the Netherlands, and populations are fragmented on the Iberian peninsula. It is included in some national and regional red lists. Drainage and pollution of breeding sites, the introduction of fish and crayfish, as well as desertification (in the southern range), have been cited as threats. Like all amphibians, it is listed as protected species in the Berne Convention (Appendix III), and it is legally protected by law in the countries it occurs in.

References

Lissotriton
Amphibians of Europe
Fauna of the United Kingdom
Amphibians described in 1789
Taxa named by Grigory Razumovsky